Harold E. Burry (May 31, 1912 – September 5, 1992) was an American football coach and college athletics administrator.  He served as the head football coach at Westminster College in New Wilmington, Pennsylvania from 1952 to 1971, compiling a record of 127–31–5.  Burry also coached a number of other sports at Westminster and was the school's athletic director from 1961 to 1977.  He was inducted into the College Football Hall of Fame in 1996.

Burry graduated from Westminster College in 1935.  He began his coaching career at Ellwood City High School in Ellwood City, Pennsylvania, where he was head football coach from 1935 to 1943.  Burry returned to Westminster in 1946 to coach soccer, swimming, track, and cross country.

Head coaching record

College football

References

External links
 

1912 births
1992 deaths
American soccer coaches
Westminster Titans athletic directors
Westminster Titans football coaches
College cross country coaches in the United States
College men's soccer coaches in the United States
College swimming coaches in the United States
College track and field coaches in the United States
High school football coaches in Pennsylvania
College Football Hall of Fame inductees
Westminster College (Pennsylvania) alumni
People from New Castle, Pennsylvania
Coaches of American football from  Pennsylvania